The variable limestone babbler (Gypsophila crispifrons) is a species of bird in the family Pellorneidae.
It is found in the limestone hills of northern and eastern Thailand northwest to southern Myanmar. Two other Gypsophila species, the Annam limestone babbler (G. annamensis) and the rufous limestone babbler (G. calcicola) were previously considered subspecies of crispiforns, but a 2020 study found them to be distinct species.

References

Collar, N. J. & Robson, C. 2007. Family Timaliidae (Babblers)  pp. 70–291 in; del Hoyo, J., Elliott, A. & Christie, D.A. eds. Handbook of the Birds of the World, Vol. 12. Picathartes to Tits and Chickadees. Lynx Edicions, Barcelona.

variable limestone babbler
Birds of Laos
Birds of Thailand
Birds of Vietnam
variable limestone babbler
variable limestone babbler
Taxonomy articles created by Polbot
Taxobox binomials not recognized by IUCN